Bresnica is a village in Serbia. It is situated in the Koceljeva municipality, in the Mačva District of Central Serbia. The village had a Serb ethnic majority and a population of 229 in 2002.

Historical population

1948: 519
1953: 531
1961: 478
1971: 395
1981: 327
1991: 262
2002: 229

References

See also
List of places in Serbia

Populated places in Mačva District